Milán Németh (born 29 May 1988 in Szombathely) is a Hungarian football player who currently plays for Szombathelyi Haladás.

Club statistics

Updated to games played as of 19 May 2019.

External links 
HLSZ
MLSZ

1988 births
Living people
Sportspeople from Szombathely
Hungarian footballers
Association football defenders
Lombard-Pápa TFC footballers
Diósgyőri VTK players
Soproni VSE players
Szombathelyi Haladás footballers
Nemzeti Bajnokság I players